The Third Album is the title of Barbra Streisand's third solo studio album which was released in February 1964. By 1966, the album sold over one million copies worldwide.

Artwork
The photograph on the album cover was taken by actor Roddy McDowall when Streisand was performing on The Judy Garland Show in October 1963.

Critical reception

AllMusic gave the album a retrospective three (out of five) stars, and called it "another demonstration of the beauty of Barbra Streisand's voice, also suggested that her interpretive abilities remained limited."

Commercial performance
After the success of Streisand's previous two albums, The Barbra Streisand Album and The Second Barbra Streisand Album, it was expected that The Third Album would do as well. The album turned out to be very successful; it reached #5 on Billboard's Pop Albums Chart and was certified Gold by the RIAA. It stayed on the Billboard 200 for 74 weeks.

Song information
"My Melancholy Baby" was first performed by William Frawley in 1912.
"Just in Time" was introduced in the musical Bells Are Ringing.  The arrangement on this LP makes use of the Prelude from J.S. Bach's "Prelude and Fugue in C Major" from the Well-Tempered Clavier.
"Taking a Chance on Love" was introduced by Ethel Waters in the musical Cabin In The Sky.
"Bewitched, Bothered and Bewildered" was introduced in the musical Pal Joey.
"Never Will I Marry" was introduced by Anthony Perkins in the 1960 musical Greenwillow.
"As Time Goes By" was introduced in the musical Everybody's Welcome, and featured in the 1942 film Casablanca.
"It Had to Be You" was first published in 1924.
"Make Believe" was introduced in the musical Show Boat.
"I Had Myself a True Love" was introduced in the 1946 musical St. Louis Woman.

Track listing

Personnel
Barbra Streisand – vocals
Mike Berniker - producer
Ray Ellis, Sid Ramin, Peter Daniels, Peter Matz - arrangements, conductor
Frank Laico, Ted Brosnan - recording engineer
Roddy McDowall - cover photography from The Judy Garland Show, October 1963
Sammy Cahn - liner notes

Chart positions

Weekly charts

Certifications and sales

External links
The Barbra Streisand Music Guide – The Third Album

References

Barbra Streisand albums
1964 albums
Albums produced by Mike Berniker
Albums conducted by Ray Ellis
Albums conducted by Peter Matz
Albums arranged by Ray Ellis
Albums arranged by Peter Matz
Columbia Records albums